KGBT-FM (98.5 MHz) is an American radio station in McAllen, Texas, owned by Latino Media Network; under a local marketing agreement, it is programmed by former owner TelevisaUnivision's Uforia Audio Network, which offers a Regional Mexican music format. The station has had a Regional Mexican format since 1997. It is a sister to KGBT and a former sister of KGBT-TV. Its studios are located in McAllen, Texas, while its transmitter is located in La Feria, Texas.

History

The 98.5 frequency went on the air October 4, 1966 as the Rio Broadcasting Company's KQXX (though the permit was known as KABG-FM before going on the air). KQXX maintained studios in the Casa de Palmas Hotel in McAllen. One of the founders was Ed Gomez, a local radio and TV personality who went on to be elected a Hidalgo County judge. The station changed formats from country to Spanish.

In 1980, Bravo Broadcasting bought KQXX and increased its power to the present 100,000 watts. A new Rio Broadcasting Company acquired the station in 1990. Tichenor acquired the station in 1996 and rechristened it as KGBT-FM on January 20, 1997.

References

External links
FCC History Cards for KGBT-FM
 FCC FM Query Results for KGBT-FM
 

Regional Mexican radio stations in the United States
GBT-FM
Mass media in McAllen, Texas